Lipovec is a small settlement just south of Semič in southeastern Slovenia. The Municipality of Semič is part of the historical region of Lower Carniola. The municipality is now included in the Southeast Slovenia Statistical Region.

References

External links
Lipovec at Geopedia

Populated places in the Municipality of Semič